Olive Branch High School is a public high school in Olive Branch, Mississippi, United States. Olive Branch is a part of the DeSoto County School District.

History
Olive Branch High School was established in 1970 after combining Olive Branch High School and East Side High School. The school's mascot- the Conquistador- was chosen because "it was neither black nor white. It was seen as a conqueror to overcome the racial segregation of the past." The high school moved into its new and current building in 1996.

Athletics

Teams
Olive Branch's athletic teams are nicknamed the Conquistadors and the school's colors are white, gold, and blue. Olive Branch teams compete in the following sports:

Baseball
Basketball
Bowling
Cross Country
Football 
Golf
Powerlifting
Soccer
Softball
Swimming
Tennis
Track and Field
Volleyball

State championships
Football
2011 Mississippi 6A State Champions

Basketball
2018 Mississippi 5A State Champions

Demographics
54% of the students at Olive Branch identify as Caucasian. 39% identify as African American, 6% as Hispanic, and 1% identify as Asian.

Notable alumni
Daren Bates, NFL linebacker for the Tennessee Titans
Shon Coleman, NFL offensive tackle for the Cleveland Browns
Jalen Collins, NFL Free Agent cornerback 
Wynton McManis, CFL linebacker for the Calgary Stampeders
Jeff Walker, NFL offensive lineman for the San Diego Chargers and the New Orleans Saints
K. J. Wright, NFL linebacker for the Seattle Seahawks

References

External links
 

Public high schools in Mississippi
Schools in DeSoto County, Mississippi
Educational institutions established in 1970
1970 establishments in Mississippi